Kelda Helen Roys (born June 24, 1979) is an American tech entrepreneur, business owner, attorney, and Democratic politician.  She currently serves in the Wisconsin State Senate, representing the 26th senatorial district.  She succeeded Fred Risser in 2021, who was the longest-serving state legislator in American history.  She previously served two terms in the Wisconsin State Assembly, was a candidate for the U.S. House of Representatives in 2012 and for Governor of Wisconsin in 2018.

Early life and education 
Roys was born in Marshfield, Wisconsin, and raised in Medford and Madison. Her mother was a social worker, her stepfather was an environmental lawyer, and her father was a retired prosecutor and law enforcement officer. Roys graduated from Madison East High School in 1997.

Roys attended New York University, where she designed her own major in politics, drama, and cultural studies, and received a B.A., magna cum laude, in 2000. In 2004, she received a J.D., magna cum laude, from the University of Wisconsin Law School, focusing on civil rights and international law, and was a participant in the Wisconsin Innocence Project. During and after college, Roys worked full-time as a real estate agent at The Marketing Directors, Inc.

Community involvement 

Roys has served on the boards of Clean Lakes Alliance, TEMPO Madison, Citizen Action of Wisconsin, Wisconsin Women's Council, ACLU of Wisconsin, Madison Repertory Theater, Dane County Democratic Party, Sherman Neighborhood Association, Wisconsin Public Interest Law Foundation, Citizen Action of Wisconsin, and the State Bar of Wisconsin's Legal Services Committee.

Political career

Law and advocacy 
During law school, she worked at the Wisconsin Innocence Project, as well as several international law firms. After law school, she served for four years as the executive director of NARAL Pro-Choice Wisconsin, where she successfully advocated for passage of the Compassionate Care for Rape Victims Act. She currently practices real estate law and serves as CEO and Founder of her real estate startup, OpenHomes.

Politics

Wisconsin State Assembly (2009-2013) 
In 2008, Roys won election to the Wisconsin State Assembly representing the 81st Assembly district, filling the seat left vacant by the retirement of David Travis, who had held the seat since 1983. She won a six-way Democratic primary with 30% of the vote and was unopposed in the general election.

After being reelected in 2010, Roys was chosen by her peers to serve as the Democratic Caucus chair in the Assembly. Roys served as vice-chair of the Committee on Health and Healthcare Reform, and later served as ranking member on the Committee on Elections and Campaign Finance Reform and the Committee on Consumer Protection & Personal Privacy.

Roys authored numerous pieces of legislation during her time in office, including public breastfeeding protections, additional income tax deductions for families, expanded college savings programs, reproductive health access, expanding health care coverage, increased training and data collection for law enforcement officers, expansion of AODA treatment services and prevention programs, and a successful statewide ban of Bisphenol A, or "BPA." Roys also publicly fought against 2011 Wisconsin Act 10, and had pledged to repeal the law if elected governor.

2012 congressional election

In 2012, when Congresswoman Tammy Baldwin ran for the U.S. Senate seat being vacated by Herb Kohl, Roys left her Assembly seat to run for office in the open 2nd Congressional district. She lost to Mark Pocan in a four-candidate Democratic primary.

2018 gubernatorial election

Roys declared her candidacy for governor of Wisconsin on December 7, 2017.

Roys gained national attention when a campaign ad in which she breastfeeds her infant daughter went viral. She was endorsed by EMILY's List, NOW, NARAL Pro-Choice America, Feminist Majority Foundation, former gubernatorial candidate Andy Gronik, former State Senator Jessica King, Representatives JoCasta Zamarripa and Amanda Stuck, and Kate Michelman, Nancy Keenan, Jehmu Greene, Ruth Messinger, Robert Lopez, and Sarah Silverman.

Roys won first place by 12 points in the Democratic Party of Wisconsin State Convention straw poll. In July 2018, the Roys campaign announced that she had raised over $800,000.

Roys came in third in the eight candidate Democratic primary on August 28, 2018, with Tony Evers winning the nomination.

2020 state senate election
In March 2020, Fred Risser, the longest-serving legislator in American history, announced he would retire from his seat in the Wisconsin State Senate at the end of the current term.  Roys immediately announced her candidacy to run for the vacated seat.  The race, in the heavily Democratic region of Dane County, Wisconsin, attracted six other candidates in a crowded Democratic primary, which was also defined by the COVID-19 pandemic in Wisconsin and the protests against institutional racism prompted by the murder of George Floyd. In the August primary, Roys prevailed over her six competitors, winning 40% of the vote.  She was unopposed in the November general election, and assumed office in January 2021.

Business career 
In 2013, Roys founded a venture-backed real estate tech company, OpenHomes, a virtual real estate agency that helps people buy and sell homes more efficiently and affordably.

References

External links

 Profile at the Wisconsin Senate
 Campaign website
 
 
Campaign contributions at Wisconsin Democracy Campaign
Company website
Gubernatorial campaign website (Archived - August 26, 2018)

American abortion-rights activists
Democratic Party members of the Wisconsin State Assembly
Democratic Party Wisconsin state senators
Politicians from Madison, Wisconsin
People from Marshfield, Wisconsin
Women state legislators in Wisconsin
New York University alumni
University of Wisconsin Law School alumni
1979 births
Living people
21st-century American businesspeople
21st-century American politicians
21st-century American women politicians
Lawyers from Madison, Wisconsin
Candidates in the 2012 United States elections
People from Medford, Wisconsin
Madison East High School alumni